Przemysław Urbański (born 4 January 1982) is a former Polish footballer who played as a forward. Urbański played his football in the Pomeranian region of Poland, starting his career with Lechia Gdańsk, also playing for Unia Tczew, Czarni Pruszcz Gdański, Bałtyk Gdynia, and GKS Kowale. Since retiring from football Urbański has moved into a coaching role at Lechia Gdańsk working with the Lechia Gdańsk academy. Urbański is the father of professional Polish football player Kacper Urbański.

References

1983 births
Lechia Gdańsk players
Unia Tczew players
Polish footballers
Association football forwards
Living people